Ariel Bareli (born ) is the rabbi of Beit El. He is the author of several books in Hebrew on monetary laws in halakha.

Previously he was an educator at the Hesder Yeshiva of Sderot.

He was born in Jerusalem and studied under Rabbi Avraham Shapira.

His maternal grandfather was Rabbi Moshe-Zvi Neria.

References 

1970 births
Living people
Chief rabbis of cities
Israeli educators
Israeli male writers
Writers from Jerusalem